Classic Cola is a cola made for Sainsbury's Supermarkets in the United Kingdom. It was launched in the mid-1990s and, unlike other store brand colas, which are seen as cheap versions of the real thing, this was designed to be a worthy competitor to main rivals Coca-Cola and Pepsi and the other new contender in the cola business at that time, Virgin Cola, during a period of time which the UK media dubbed "the cola wars". Sainsbury's continues to sell Classic Cola, but it no longer has the same brand recognition as the two major brands. Virgin Cola disappeared from the UK market in 2012.

References

Cola brands
Sainsbury's
Store brands